CHTC Fong's Industries Co., Ltd. is a company founded by Fong Sou Lam in 1963. Fong's Industries has principally focused on the business of designing, developing, manufacturing and selling of textile dyeing and finishing machinery. Starting in 1969, the business has been carried on under the name of Fong's National Engineering Co., Ltd. and becomes one of the first Hong Kong companies to explore the giant textile dyeing finishing market in China—a key turning point for the Group's future development.

In 1990, Fong's Industries Co., Ltd. was the first company of its kind publicly listed on the Hong Kong Stock Exchange. To accommodate the need of major raw materials for its manufacturing business, the Group also set up the stainless steel trading and stainless steel castings manufacturing businesses. Today the group has a workforce of approximately 4,700 employees serving over 5,700 customers worldwide.

Portfolio
Fong's Industries Group was founded in 1963 and was the first Chinese textile machinery manufacturer to acquire European companies such as Switzerland-based Xorella and German companies Then Maschinen-und Apparatebau GmbH and GTM Goller Textilemaschinen GmbH. It has also found Fong's Water Technology Co. Ltd. to provide water treatment and reuse systems with comprehensive services. The group consists of the following brands:
 FONG'S NATIONAL
 THEN
 GOLLER
 MONFORTS
 XORELLA
 FWT
 FONG’S STEEL
 TYCON ALLOY

References

External links
 

Manufacturing companies established in 1963
Companies listed on the Hong Kong Stock Exchange
Offshore companies of Bermuda
Textile companies of Hong Kong
1963 establishments in Hong Kong